Dietzia lutea is a bacterium from the genus Dietzia which has been isolated from desert soil in Egypt.

References

Further reading

External links
Type strain of Dietzia lutea at BacDive -  the Bacterial Diversity Metadatabase	

Mycobacteriales
Bacteria described in 2011